is a Japanese rugby union player who plays in the back row for the Toshiba Brave Lupus in Japan Rugby League One and captains the Japan national team. Leitch was born in New Zealand and moved to Japan as a teenager.

Early life
Leitch was born in Burwood, Christchurch, New Zealand, to a European New Zealand father and a Fijian mother. He was raised in Christchurch where he attended St Bede's College. In 2004, at the age of 15, he went to Sapporo Yamanote High School in Sapporo, Japan, as part of St Bede's school exchange program.

After finishing school he attended Tokai University and in 2008 captained the Japan U20 team at the Junior World Championship. He became a Japanese national in 2013 and officially inverted his name in Japanese from Michael Leitch to Leitch Michael.

Professional career
He made his test match debut for Japan in 2008 against the USA in Nagoya aged 20, receiving a yellow card in that game for a dangerous tackle. He quickly established himself as a regular member of the national side. His first try came against Kazakhstan in April 2009.

He impressed in the 2011 Rugby World Cup and was praised as one of Japan's best forwards, winning 'man of the match' in the loss to Tonga, where he scored a try and made a try-saving tackle on Siale Piutau. After the World Cup he joined the Toshiba Brave Lupus in the Top League. In his first season he was named in the league's team of the season and given the award of "revelation of the season" at the end of the season awards. He followed this up by being named in the team of the season for a second season in 2012/2013.

He moved back to New Zealand after being named in the Hamilton-based  wider training squad for 2013, but was denied the chance to play after breaking an arm. In his first match back from injury, playing for Japan against Fiji in June, he broke a leg. He got a second chance with the Chiefs, signing a contract with the side for the 2015 Super Rugby season.

He was appointed Japan captain by coach Eddie Jones in April 2014, becoming the second New Zealand-born player to lead the Brave Blossoms after Andrew McCormick in the 1990s.

He captained the Japan national team at the 2015 Rugby World Cup, famously defeating South Africa in one of the biggest upsets ever. This victory is the core of the film The Brighton Miracle, in which he is played by Lasarus Ratuere; but also appears as himself.

For the 2018 season, Leitch moved to the Sunwolves, the Japanese Super Rugby team.

At the 2019 World Cup, when Japan were hosts, he led the victory over Ireland, ranked second in the world at that time, and then defeated Scotland to qualify for the knockout stages for the first time ever.

There is a statue of Leitch in one of the communal parks in Tokyo. During the 2019 World Cup it was a popular place for fans to have their photos taken.

References

External links

michaelleitch.com, official personal site
RWC 2011 profile

Living people
1988 births
Japanese people of I-Taukei Fijian descent
New Zealand people of I-Taukei Fijian descent
Rugby union players from Christchurch
New Zealand rugby union players
Japanese rugby union players
Japan international rugby union players
Rugby union flankers
New Zealand expatriate rugby union players
Expatriate rugby union players in Japan
New Zealand expatriate sportspeople in Japan
Toshiba Brave Lupus Tokyo players
Chiefs (rugby union) players
Male rugby sevens players
Asian Games medalists in rugby union
Rugby union players at the 2014 Asian Games
Fijian people of British descent
Japanese people of British descent
Japanese people of New Zealand descent
Asian Games gold medalists for Japan
Medalists at the 2014 Asian Games
Japan international rugby sevens players
Sunwolves players
People educated at St Bede's College, Christchurch
Tokai University alumni
Rugby union number eights